Jianyang is a county-level city under the administration of the prefecture-level city of Chengdu, in Sichuan Province, Southwest China. Situated only 48 kilometers south east of the city center (urban districts) of Chengdu, Jianyang is administratively under the jurisdiction of Chengdu, changed from being a prefecture-level city of Ziyang since May 2016. The preparation work for changing it to "Jianyang District" is already started as of August 2019. The urban center is located on the banks of the Tuo River.

History
Jianyang has a recorded history dating back over two thousand years. It was part of the state of Shu until the third century BC and was incorporated into the Qin Empire following the unification of China under Qin Shihuang.

In the early Mongolian Yuan dynasty, it was named Jianzhou (简州). It adopted the name Jianyang County after 1913 during the Republic of China. After the foundation of the People's Republic of China, it was incorporated into the Neijiang Administration Zone. It was divided into communes during the Cultural Revolution. When the communes were abolished, it was re-organized under Chengdu. In 1994, the county was converted into a county-level city. In 2007, the county was given broad autonomy over its budgeting and financial affairs by the State Council as part of a wider experiment. In 2016, the State Council transferred jurisdiction of Jianyang from Ziyang to Chengdu, ostensibly to increase urban integration with the provincial capital.

Administration
Jianyang was administered by the prefecture-level city of Ziyang up until 2016 when it was transferred to Chengdu prefecture due to Jianyang's economic integration as a part of the greater Chengdu metropolitan area. Jianyang is home to commuters who work in Chengdu.

Administratively, Jianyang is subdivided into four subdistricts, 25 towns, 29 townships, and over 800 villages or equivalents.

In practice, many "villages" are basically urban areas with high-rise residential properties built after 2000.

Demographics
As of 2012, there are just over 1.48 million residents estimated to be living in Jianyang. Of these, the vast majority (some 1.21 million) are rural residents. The natural population growth rate without taking into account net migration figures is 1.19% as of 2012. Over 99% of the population is of Han ethnicity. There are small Yi, Tujia, and Tibetan populations, each numbering no more than a few hundred.

Climate

Transportation
Development of local transport advanced rapidly between 1990 and 2010. Jianyang is served by numerous local freeways, including an expressway that connects it to Chengdu, the Chengdu-Chongqing Expressway, and the Second Ring Expressway of Chengdu, in addition to China National Highways 318, 319, and 321.

Jianyang Railway Station serves the city. Jianyang South Railway Station is a high-speed rail station on the Chengdu–Chongqing Intercity Railway.

As of 2016, the Chengdu Tianfu International Airport, intended to be a new hub servicing southwestern China, is under construction in the Jianyang area.

Economy
The local economy is mainly dependent on agriculture and the production of machinery. There are factories in the region producing metal tools, tractors, and knives. Ruonan Foods headquarters is located in Jianyang. As of 2013 recorded a GDP of 34.48 billion yuan.

The Sichuan Provincial Women's Prison is located in the town of Yangma, in Jianyang city limits.

Haidilao hot pot restaurant chain was founded in Jianyang but the headquarters has since moved to Beijing.

References

 
County-level cities in Sichuan
Geography of Chengdu